
The following is a list of episodes of Wait Wait... Don't Tell Me!, NPR's news panel game, that aired during 2023.  All episodes, unless otherwise indicated, originate from the Studebaker Theatre at Chicago's Fine Arts Building.  Dates indicated are the episodes' original Saturday air dates.  Job titles and backgrounds of the guests reflect their status and positions at the time of their appearance.

Also unless otherwise indicated, each episode features Peter Sagal as host and Bill Kurtis as announcer/scorekeeper. Sagal announced on January 28 that he would step away from the show on parental leave (after the birth of his 5th child), with plans to return in late March.

January

February

March

April

June

References

External links
Wait Wait... Don't Tell Me! official website
WWDT.me, an unofficial Wait Wait historical site

Wait Wait Don't Tell Me
Wait Wait... Don't Tell Me!
Wait Wait Don't Tell Me